Bhilwara Lok Sabha constituency is one of the 25 Lok Sabha (parliamentary) constituencies in Rajasthan state in India.

Assembly segments
Presently, Bhilwara Lok Sabha constituency comprises eight Vidhan Sabha (legislative assembly) segments. These are:

Members of Parliament

Election results

2019

2014

2009

2004

See also
 Bhilwara district
 List of Constituencies of the Lok Sabha

References

Bhilwara district
Lok Sabha constituencies in Rajasthan